The Harvard–Princeton football rivalry is an American college football rivalry between the Harvard Crimson football team of Harvard University and the Princeton Tigers football team of Princeton University. Princeton leads the series 59–48–7.

Significance
The football rivalry is constituent to the Big Three academic, athletic and social rivalry among alumni and students associated with Harvard, Yale and Princeton universities.

Agreements among the athletics departments in 1906, 1916, the "Three Presidents Agreement" on eligibility, and a revision of that Agreement in 1923 have been considered precursors to the Ivy Group Agreement creating the Ivy League, each agreement  addressing amateurism and college football.

Twenty eight different teams, 17 representing Harvard and 11 representing Princeton, have shared or won outright the Ivy League football title.

Bad blood has flowed between the two football programs. Princeton, for example, turned down Harvard's offer of a Thanksgiving Day contest in 1892, with Harvard refusing to play Princeton that season.

The 1920s was a nadir for athletic relations between the institutions.

F. Scott Fitzgerald's Amory Blaine, protagonist in This Side of Paradise, published in 1920, states plainly, "I want to go to Princeton...I don't know why, but I think of all Harvard men as sissies, like I used to be, and all Yale men as wearing big blue sweaters and smoking pipes."

Harvard and Princeton ceased the football series for nearly a decade, 1926 – 1934, in part because of an over the top Harvard Lampoon spoof issue of The Harvard Crimson distributed during the 1926 contest that announced the death of Princeton's head coach, Bill Roper, a man who had a history of serious illness. Roper, who coached Princeton's Team of Destiny, is a member of the College Football Hall of Fame. William J. Bingham, a Harvard alumnus and athletics administrator, decided Harvard football could not guarantee to play any football program save Yale. Harvard wanted to play a national schedule was the declared reason for the change.

Notable games

1926
Princeton shut out Harvard, 12–0, then shunned Harvard for eight football seasons; then Princeton shut out Harvard, 19–0, in 1934. Thereafter, save the World War II years, the two programs have met annually.

1950
The 1950 Princeton Tigers football team, coached by former Princeton player Charley Caldwell, claimed a national title. The undefeated, untied team embarrassed Harvard, 63–26, at Palmer Stadium en route to a HYP and other championships.

1951
The 1951 Princeton football team crushed the Crimson, 54–13 in Boston.

1967
Ellis Moore ran for five touchdowns versus Harvard. Moore's effort is the 20th-century Princeton record for rushing touchdowns in a game. Princeton won, 45–6. Moore rushed for three touchdowns versus Harvard two seasons later.

2012
Quinn Epperly tossed, with 0:13 remaining in the game, a 36-yard touchdown to Roman Wilson to take the lead and win eventually, 39–34, at Princeton Stadium. Harvard led, 34–10, early in the fourth quarter. Wilson caught five passes.

2016
"Princeton certainly didn't deserve to lose the game,"
Harvard's Tim Murphy said, a sentiment shared at least by Princeton partisans, after Harvard's 23 – 20 win at Princeton University Stadium. Joe Viviano, Harvard quarterback, scored from the one on second down after Princeton settled for a field goal in overtime. Harvard's Luke Hutton defended successfully a pass play at the one yard line during Princeton's overtime possession.

Princeton shares League title with Penn after Yale defeats Harvard later in the season, denying Harvard a fourth-straight outright or shared League title.

Game results

See also 
 List of NCAA college football rivalry games
 List of most-played college football series in NCAA Division I
 Big Three (colleges)

References

College football rivalries in the United States
Harvard Crimson football
Princeton Tigers football